Jamie Annerson (born 1 November 1988) is an English footballer who plays as a goalkeeper. Born in Sheffield, South Yorkshire, Annerson started his career with Sheffield United in 2006 but never broke into the first team. He moved to Rotherham United in 2009 but was released in 2013 signing for Sheffield FC in September. Annerson has also represented England U19s and has had loan spells at Chesterfield, Mansfield Town and Bradford City.

Playing career

Club career

Sheffield United
Annerson came through the youth ranks at Sheffield United and was loaned out to Rotherham United in September 2007 for 3 months as cover, but returned to Sheffield United after making just one appearance for the Millers, in a Football League Trophy match against Grimsby Town. He was then loaned out to Chesterfield in March 2008 to gain further experience, but failed to make a first team appearance before returning to Bramall Lane.

Annerson was again loaned out to Rotherham United for one month in October 2008. He returned to Bramall Lane in November having once again failed to make a first team start and was almost immediately loaned out again to Mansfield Town as emergency cover for their injured keeper.

Annerson made his debut for the Stags on the day of his arrival, starting in a 2–0 defeat at Kidderminster. Having played once more for the Stags he returned to Bramall Lane after two weeks when Mansfield's regular keeper regained fitness.

Rotherham United
After being released by Sheffield United at the end of the 2008–09 season, Annerson joined Rotherham United on a free transfer. Remaining on the fringes of the first team, he moved on loan to Bradford City in February 2012. He was transfer listed by Rotherham in May 2012, before being released from his contract by mutual agreement in July 2012.

Sheffield F.C.
Annerson signed for the club after impressing manager Ian Whitehorne in a trial game.

International career
Annerson impressed enough in the Blades reserves to earn a place in the England U-19s.

Statistics

References

External links
Jamie Annerson player profile at Sheffield United F.C.
Jamie Annerson player profile at Chesterfield F.C.

1988 births
Living people
Footballers from Sheffield
English footballers
Association football goalkeepers
English Football League players
National League (English football) players
Sheffield United F.C. players
Rotherham United F.C. players
Chesterfield F.C. players
Mansfield Town F.C. players
Bradford City A.F.C. players
Sheffield F.C. players